Chrastince is a village and municipality in the Veľký Krtíš District of the Banská Bystrica Region of southern Slovakia.

History
The village was first mentioned in King Béla IV's List in 1244 (1244 Gyormoth, 1299 Haraztigyormoth) as a donation to Balassa feudatory family. In the 18th century it belonged to Gürky family and in the 19th century to Zichy and Majthény. From 896 to 1920 and 1938 to 1945 it belonged to Hungary.

Genealogical resources

The records for genealogical research are available at the state archive "Statny Archiv in Banska Bystrica, Slovakia"

 Roman Catholic church records (births/marriages/deaths): 1699-1897 (parish AB)
 Lutheran church records (births/marriages/deaths): 1721-1862 (parish B)

See also
 List of municipalities and towns in Slovakia

References

External links
 
http://www.e-obce.sk/obec/chrastince/chrastince.html

Villages and municipalities in Veľký Krtíš District